The following is a list of beetles in the family Coccinellidae recorded in Great Britain. The larger and more conspicuous species are commonly known as ladybirds. For other beetles, see List of beetle species recorded in Britain.

Coccidula rufa (Herbst, 1783)
Coccidula scutellata (Herbst, 1783)
Rhyzobius chrysomeloides (Herbst, 1792)
Rhyzobius litura (Fabricius, 1787)
Rhyzobius lophanthae (Blaisdell, 1892)
Rodolia cardinalis (Mulsant, 1850)
Clitostethus arcuatus (Rossi, 1794)
Stethorus punctillum (Weise, 1891)
Scymnus femoralis (Gyllenhal, 1827)
Scymnus frontalis (Fabricius, 1787)
Scymnus interruptus (Goeze, 1777)
Scymnus jakowlewi Weise, 1892
Scymnus nigrinus Kugelann, 1794
Scymnus rubromaculatus (Goeze, 1777)
Scymnus schmidti Fürsch, 1958
Scymnus auritus Thunberg, 1795
Scymnus suturalis Thunberg, 1795
Scymnus haemorrhoidalis Herbst, 1797
Scymnus limbatus Stephens, 1832
Nephus bisignatus (Boheman, 1850)
Nephus quadrimaculatus (Herbst, 1783)
Nephus redtenbacheri (Mulsant, 1846)
Cryptolaemus montrouzieri Mulsant, 1853
Hyperaspis pseudopustulata Mulsant, 1853
Platynaspis luteorubra (Goeze, 1777)
Chilocorus bipustulatus (Linnaeus, 1758)
Chilocorus renipustulatus (Scriba, 1791)
Exochomus quadripustulatus (Linnaeus, 1758)
Coccinula quattuordecimpustulata (Linnaeus, 1758)
Anisosticta novemdecimpunctata (Linnaeus, 1758)
Tytthaspis sedecimpunctata (Linnaeus, 1761)
Myzia oblongoguttata (Linnaeus, 1758)
Myrrha octodecimguttata (Linnaeus, 1758)
Propylea quatuordecimpunctata (Linnaeus, 1758)
Calvia quatuordecimguttata (Linnaeus, 1758)
Vibidia duodecimguttata (Poda, 1761)
Halyzia sedecimguttata (Linnaeus, 1758)
Psyllobora vigintiduopunctata (Linnaeus, 1758)
Anatis ocellata (Linnaeus, 1758)
Aphidecta obliterata (Linnaeus, 1758)
Hippodamia tredecimpunctata (Linnaeus, 1758)
Hippodamia variegata (Goeze, 1777)
Coccinella hieroglyphica Linnaeus, 1758
Coccinella magnifica Redtenbacher, 1843
Coccinella quinquepunctata Linnaeus, 1758
Coccinella septempunctata Linnaeus, 1758
Coccinella undecimpunctata Linnaeus, 1758
Adalia bipunctata (Linnaeus, 1758)
Adalia decempunctata (Linnaeus, 1758)
Harmonia axyridis (Pallas, 1773)
Harmonia quadripunctata (Pontoppidan, 1763)
Henosepilachna argus (Geoffory in Fourcroy, 1762)
Subcoccinella vigintiquatuorpunctata (Linnaeus, 1758)

References

Ladybirds